The term alpha chain is normally used to indicate one of the subunits of a multi-subunit protein. The term "chain" is a general term given to any peptide sequence. It can often refer more specifically to mean:
 a part of the T-cell receptor,
 the fibrinogen alpha chain,
 the integrin alpha chain,
 Hemoglobin, alpha 1

It should be distinguished from the term alpha helix, which refers to one of the common secondary structures found in proteins, along with beta sheet.

See also
 Fibrinogen
 Peptide

References

Protein structure